Edmond Michel was a Frenchman who immigrated to the United States in the early 20th century.  He lived in New Orleans.  His claim to fame was the invention of the handheld circular saw.  Watching sugar farmers cut through thick cane stalks with machetes, he believed that there was a better way.

Michel mounted a mixer motor onto a standard machete, as well as a worm wheel gearbox and a 2-inch circular blade.  This invention, while actually working fairly effectively (if slowly), required an external generator, making it quite impractical.

In creating this device, Michel effectively invented the worm-drive motor.

Michel then tried again, using a piece of wood with a notch carved into it.  In the notch, he mounted the same mechanism as the mechanical reaper, but with a 6-inch blade.  This was the first electric circular saw.

After a New Orleans newspaper ran an article about Michel's invention, he was approached by Joseph W. Sullivan.  The two became business partners and moved to Chicago.  In 1924, they were granted a patent for the Michel Electric Hand Saw.  Attracting immediate interest from contractors despite numerous mechanical problems, the two began production of the saw.  The name was changed to Skil in 1926, after Sullivan's wife commented on the skill necessary to use one.

Just before the Great Depression, Michel withdrew from the company to work on new inventions.  After leaving the Skil company, Michel invested his share of the money inventing and developing Larmloc, the first keypad-based lock.  Sadly, this invention failed to pan out, and only one working prototype was ever made.

This inventor remains largely forgotten in American history, but is still remembered by his family.  His youngest daughter Lorretta Brown still lives in Chicago.

References 

Interview with Marguerite Brown (daughter of Edmond Michel) by her grandson, Nicholas Tausek
 Canlen, Brae (October 25, 1999.) Retooling America. FindArticles. Archived from the original on September 22, 2007.
 Frechette, Leon A. (December 1993.) The great divide. asktooltalk.com / Remodeling News

Year of birth missing
Year of death missing
20th-century American inventors

20th-century French inventors
People from New Orleans